Homelessness in Vatican City is a minor social issue. A shelter has been established just outside the Vatican walls and was opened by Pope Francis. The shelter is called “Gift of Mercy” (“Dono di Misericordia”).

The pope has also organized for showers to be built in the public restrooms and allowed a deceased homeless man to be buried in the Vatican.

References

Vatican City
Society of Vatican City